The 2014 Great Southern 4 Hour was a motor race staged at the Phillip Island Grand Prix Circuit in Victoria, Australia on 25 May 2014. It was Round 2 of the 2014 Australian Manufacturers' Championship and as such it was open to modified production touring cars complying with the technical regulations for that championship.

The race was won by Bob Pearson and Glenn Seton driving a Mitsubishi Lancer Evolution X, repeating their 2013 Great Southern 4 Hour victory.

Classes
As the race was a round of the 2014 Australian Manufacturers' Championship, cars competed in the following classes:

 Class A - Extreme Performance
 Class B - High Performance
 Class C - Performance Touring
 Class D - Production Touring
 Class E - Compact Touring (no entries)
 Class F - Hybrid/Alternative Energy (no entries)
 Class I - Invitational

Results

Notes:
 Winner's race time: 3:51:04.0546 (140 km/h) 
 Fastest race lap: Car no 33: 1:45.2551 (152 km/h)

References

External links 
 Image gallery of the 2014 Great Southern 4 Hour at www.manchamps.com.au via webarchive.org

Great Southern 4 Hour